All for Love is a 2012 Chinese romantic comedy film directed by Jiang Ping and written by Zhu Ping and Xu Yiwen, starring Ariel Aisin-Gioro, Che Yongli, Alec Su, and Ju Wenpei.  All For Love was released in China on 26 October 2012.

Cast
Ariel Aisin-Gioro as Ye Xiaomeng, the urban female white-collar.
Che Yongli as Mei Ling, Liu Erbiao's lover.
Alec Su as Gu Donghai, Ye Xiaomeng's boyfriend.
Ju Wenpei as Dong A Ping, a woman entrepreneur.

Guest
Chen Maolin as Ye Xioameng's father.
Zheng Yuzhi as Ye Xiaomeng's mother.
Zhang Jiayi as Liu Erbiao.
Huang Lei as Officer Liu.
Yang Mi as Xiao Ma.
Tong Dawei as The taxi driver.
Huang Yi as Wei Wei.
Zhu Xijuan as Liu Erbiao's mother.
Yan Bingyan as Liu Erbiao's wife.
Siqin Gaowa as Grandmother Wang.
Zhu Xu
Wen Zhang
Lu Chuan
Purba Rgyal
Sha Yi
Yvonne Yung as The head nurse.
Feng Gong
Gong Hanlin
Lu Qi
Zhang Guangbei
Jiang Hongbo
Zhong Xinghuo
Hu Ke as a Nurse.
Huang Xiaoli
Zhang Yishan as Mei Ling's brother
Wei Jindong

Production
The film began production in April 2012 and finished filming on May 3, 2012.

The film shot the scene in Nantong, Jiangsu, China.

Released
It had its world premiere at the Huabin Opera House on October 23, 2012, and it was released on October 26, 2012 in China.

The film also screened in the 4th China Image Film Festival and 8th Chinese American Film Festival.

The film was only moderately successful with critics and at the box office.

Award

References

2010s Mandarin-language films
Films set in Jiangsu
Films shot in Jiangsu
Chinese romantic comedy films
2012 romantic comedy films